The African-American Medal of Honor Recipients Memorial is a monument dedicated to African-American recipients of the Medal of Honor since 1861.

History
The sculpture on top of the monument was created by Charles Parks. It depicts Sgt. William Harvey Carney, who was the first African-American to receive the distinction, for his gallantry in saving the regimental colors (American Flag) during the Battle of Fort Wagner in 1863, and Private Milton L. Olive, who was the first black recipient of the Medal of Honor in the Vietnam War, when he sacrificed himself, age 18, by smothering a live grenade.As of 2020, there have been more than 3,500 military service members that have earned themselves the Medal of Honor. Of those 3,500 recipients, only 92 have been African-American men. The Medal of Honor has been an award that is able to be dated back to the civil war. Only major acts of heroism are recognized by the Medal of Honor award.

Location

The monument, erected and dedicated in 1998 by the African American Medal of Honor Association, Inc., is located on the intersection of 18th Street and Baynard Boulevard on 18th Street in Brandywine/Todd Memorial Park in Wilmington, Delaware.

References

External links
 African-American Medal of Honor Recipients Memorial on the Historical Marker Database

African-American military monuments and memorials